The 1993 NCAA Division I baseball season, play of college baseball in the United States organized by the National Collegiate Athletic Association (NCAA) began in the spring of 1993.  The season progressed through the regular season and concluded with the 1993 College World Series.  The College World Series, held for the forty seventh time in 1993, consisted of one team from each of eight regional competitions and was held in Omaha, Nebraska, at Johnny Rosenblatt Stadium as a double-elimination tournament.  LSU claimed the championship for the second time.

Realignment
Army and Navy departed the Eastern Intercollegiate Baseball League, which dissolved.  The Ivy League began sponsoring baseball for its 8 members, all of whom had previously competed in the EIBL.  Four teams were placed in each Ivy League Division.
Army and Navy joined the Patriot League, which divided into two divisions of four teams each.
Davidson rejoined the Southern Conference after a four-year absence.
UCF departed the Sun Belt Conference and joined the Trans America Athletic Conference

Format changes
The Mid-Continent Conference dissolved its two divisions and competed as a single conference.
With the addition of UCF to the East, the TAAC shifted Mercer to the West Division.

Conference winners
This is a partial list of conference champions from the 1993 season.  The NCAA sponsored regional competitions to determine the College World Series participants.  Each of the eight regionals consisted of six teams competing in double-elimination tournaments, with the winners advancing to Omaha.  24 teams earned automatic bids by winning their conference championship while 24 teams earned at-large selections.

Conference standings
The following is an incomplete list of conference standings:

College World Series

The 1993 season marked the forty seventh NCAA Baseball Tournament, which culminated with the eight team College World Series.  The College World Series was held in Omaha, Nebraska.  The eight teams played a double-elimination format, with LSU claiming their second championship with an 8–0 win over Wichita State in the final.

Bracket

Award winners

All-America team

References